Baton Rouge Area Foundation ("The Foundation") is a community foundation dedicated to enhancing the quality of life in Louisiana's capital region, and is registered with the IRS as a 501(c)(3) tax-deductible nonprofit organization.  Over the past 58 years, the Baton Rouge Area Foundation has responded to the wishes of its donors, the concerns of its members, and the community's needs by issuing grants totaling more than $650 million.

In addition to grants, the Baton Rouge Area Foundation has the flexibility to launch community initiatives without politics or other entanglements.  The Foundation has partnered to revive downtown Baton Rouge. It undwrote a master plan fro downtown, built an Arts Block, revived an abandoned hotel and built more than 200 apartment units to prove that people would live in the city center. Other civic projects include The Water Campus, a place dedicated to organizations that provide water science and management to imperiled communities around the world; improved services for people with mental health and addiction issues, and a master plan for preserving the University/City Park lakes system; and launching New Schools for Baton Rouge to draw the best charter schools to Baton Rouge.

History
In 1964, a group of 12 Baton Rouge business leaders created the Foundation to raise money and purchase land for the Gulf South Research Institute (GSRI) to locate offices in Baton Rouge. Since then, the nonprofit Foundation has pursued its work by connecting donors to nonprofits in South Louisiana and some other parts of the world and by undertaking  civic leadership projects, such as school reform, reviving downtown Baton Rouge and creating The Water Institute of the Gulf.

In assets, BRAF is now ranked among the top 30 community foundations in the country in an annual survey by the Columbus Foundation.

Responding to Hurricane Katrina
The foundation's grant making teams performed hundreds of assessments, identified pressing needs for displaced residents, and issued over $600,000 in emergency grants to aid organizations and shelters within 10 days of the storm.  As the recovery process moved forward,  it continued to help displaced residents in the areas of basic human needs, physical and mental health, education, and employment.  Itplayed a key role in the planning process of re-envisioning the state of Louisiana and connecting south Louisiana  in more productive and. equitable ways 
 
Late in 2006, the foundation launched a mental health initiative., In Courage,  to offer free and confidential counseling to the citizens impacted by Hurricanes Katrina and Rita. 
The program is   designed for people suffering from the after-effects of disaster.  Developed by the National Center for Post-Traumatic Stress Disorder and adjusted to the unique population and culture of Louisiana, this program uses proven methods to help those affected

Baton Rouge CityStats
A project launched by the foundation in 2008 uses Economic indicators] to measure the quality of life in East Baton Rouge, to help created a shared vision among residents. The project uses a total of 50 quality-of-life indicators that measure categories such as economy, education, public safety, and health.  CityStats is funded by the Foundation, its donors, and members.

Northshore Community Foundation 
The Northshore Community Foundation was started in January 2007 with financial assistance from the Baton Rouge Area Foundation. It is run be an independent board of directors representing St. Tammany, Tangipahoa, LIvingston and St. Helena parishes.

Community Foundation of Southwest Louisiana 
The foundation provides financial support for the Community Foundation of Southwest Louisiana, which is operated by an independent board based in Lake Charles, Louisiana. It serves five parishes (counties) - Allen, Beauregard, Calcasieu, Cameron, and Jefferson Davis.

Ernest J. Gaines Award for Literary Excellence 

The Ernest J. Gaines Award for Literary Excellence is an annual literary award that recognizes the best work of fiction submitted by a rising African-American writer. The book award honors the accomplishments of  Gaines, a Louisiana native and resident. Past winners include Nathan Harris, Gabriel Bump, Bryan Washington, Jamel Brinkley, Ladee Hubbard, Crystal Wilkinson, T. Geronimo Johnson, Mitchell S. Jackson, Attica Locke, Stephanie Powell Watts, Dinaw Mengestu, Victor LaValle, Jeffrey R. Allen, Ravi Howard, and Olympia Vernon.

University/City Park Lakes 
The Foundation raised money and led a master plan to preserve and beautify the University/City Park lakes. With partners, the Foundation then raised $50 million to implement the first two phases of the project, starting in fall 2022.

New Schools for Baton Rouge 
The foundation and its donors created New Schools for Baton Rouge, a nonprofit to recruit and provide resources to charter schools. It is working to improve failed schools that were taken over by the state of Louisiana.

Structure
The Baton Rouge Area Foundation is governed by directors who are appointed for three-year terms. Members may serve two consecutive terms, after which they must rotate off for at least one year. The board has fifteen at-large directors elected by the members. The immediate past board chair serves as a member of the executive committee and member of the Board, as does the chief executive officer of the foundation. Founding chair John W. Barton Sr. has a permanent seat as chair emeritus on the board and its executive committee.

Members of the Baton Rouge Area Foundation provide the resources that drive the administrative activities and leadership programs they undertake on an annual basis. Without membership dues the staff could not continue to provide the support that they offer to both the nonprofit agencies and their donors.

Mission
The Baton Rouge Area Foundation unites human and financial resources to enhance the quality of life in South Louisiana.

To achieve the mission, The Foundation:
 Serves donors to build the assets that drive initiatives and solutions
 Engages community leaders to develop appropriate responses to emerging opportunities and challenges
 Partners with entities from its service area, as well as with other community foundations, in order to leverage collective resources and create the capacity to be a stimulus of positive regional change
 Evaluates their work and shares the results with its stakeholders.

Geographical areas
The foundation serves eight parishes that make up the Greater Baton Rouge Area:  Ascension, East and West Baton Rouge.  East and West Feliciana, Iberville,  Livingston, and * Pointe Coupée

Funds
Establishing a fund with the foundation allow donors to connect their philanthropic giving to the issues and nonprofits that interest them most. Different types of funds that can be established.; they provide a tax deduction associated with a charitable donation. They are: 
Donor Advised Fund 

A donor-advised fund is a charitable giving vehicle administered by the Foundation and created for the purpose of managing charitable donations on behalf of the donor. A donor-advised fund offers the opportunity to create an easy-to-establish, flexible vehicle for charitable giving as an alternative to direct giving or creating a private foundation.
Field of Interest Fund 
A field of interest fund is a fund created to help a specific area, such as education, that the donor is interested in.  Field of interest funds are managed by the Foundation and its board of directors.
Unrestricted Fund 
Unrestricted funds, to pay for emerging opportunities that benefit the community as a whole. Such Unrestricted funds allow the  Foundation' o have flexibility in funding large projects such as the Shaw Center for the Arts.
 T

Scholarship Fun
Scholarship funds are established to assist college students with grants that help cover the cost of tuition, room, and board.  The foundation assists the donor in the selection process.

References

External links
 Baton Rouge Area Foundation
 www.ernestjgainesaward.org

Area Foundation
Community foundations based in the United States